Johnathan Young is a British television producer. His credits include EastEnders, Casualty, Holby City, The Bill, The Sinking of the Laconia, The Mill, Mamon, Pakt and Wataha.

In June 2005 he was appointed Head of Drama at Talkback Thames, replacing Paul Marquess who moved to Endemol.

2011 - 2013 Executive Producer of Casualty and Holby City.

2013 - 2014 Series Producer of The Mill for Channel 4

2014 - 2016 Executive Producer HBO Europe

2017 -      VP Original Production HBO Central Europe

External links 
 
 Johnathan Young - Profile on Talkback Thames website.

Year of birth missing (living people)
Living people
British television producers